Varden Kunstgress Field is located in Bergen, Norway, and is currently home to the (NoAFF) American football team Bergen Storm, as well as the association football (soccer) teams Bergen Sparta and Fyllingen Kvinner.

External links
Norway International Soccer Statistics

Sports venues in Bergen
Football venues in Norway
American football venues in Norway